Aphanactis is a genus of flowering plants in the family Asteraceae.

The genus is native to the Andes of northwestern South America, except for one species from southern Mexico.

 Species

References

 
Asteraceae genera
Taxonomy articles created by Polbot